Edwin George Forrest (June 12, 1921 – May 29, 2001) was a professional American football guard. He played two seasons with the San Francisco 49ers of the All-America Football Conference.

References

External links

San Francisco 49ers (AAFC) players
American football offensive guards
Santa Clara Broncos football players
1921 births
2001 deaths
Players of American football from San Francisco
San Francisco 49ers players